Muški rukometni klub Sloga Gornji Vakuf – Uskoplje, commonly referred to as Sloga is a professional handball club from Gornji Vakuf-Uskoplje, Bosnia and Herzegovina. The club competes in the Handball Championship of Bosnia and Herzegovina, and the EHF European Cup.

History
The club was founded in 1956 by teacher Đuro Hrčan from Pančevo (Serbia) as RK Partizan. In 1970. it was renamed "RK Rudar", and finally in 1978. to "Sloga" It is the second oldest sports club in Gornji Vakuf-Uskoplje.

Honours

Domestic competitions
First League of Federation of Bosnia and Herzegovina – South: 
 Winners (1): 2017–18

European record

Team

Current squad
Squad for the 2020–21 season

Goalkeepers
 1  Selmir Destanović
 12  Selvedin Spahić
 66  Berzad Demirović (c)
 16  Alen Čaber
Left Wingers
 13  Amar Ruspić
 15  Ivano Bodrušić
 26  Marijan Šaravanja
 5  Branko Boškić
Right Wingers
 8  Amer Dedić
 27  Ajdin Demirović
 14  Mirza Demirović
Line players
 25  Edin Gekić
 10  Arman Ljutić
 24  Radovan Uljarević
 2  Ejub Hadžić
 77  Amer Demirović
 18  Mirza Kaharić

Left Backs
 10  Haris Čaluk
 17  Mesud Pokvić
Central Backs 
 19  Božidar Simić
 4  Anes Halebić
Right Backs
 3  Goran Biljaka
 9  Adem Gudić
 6  Robert Štrkalj

Squad for the 2021–22 season

Goalkeepers
 1  Nedim Agić 
 12  Mirnes Grčo 
 16  Alen Čaber
Left Wingers
 23  Branko Boškić 
 92  Adnan Jamaković
Right Wingers
 8  Amer Dedić
 27  Ajdin Demirović
Line players
 24  Radovan Uljarević
 2  Ejub Hadžić
 77  Amer Demirović

Left Backs
 39  Goran Šarenac
 17  Mesud Pokvić
Central Backs 
 4  Anes Halebić
 9  Amar Amitović
Right Backs
 3  Goran Biljaka
 6  Robert Štrkalj

Recent seasons

The recent season-by-season performance of the club:

Key

Coaching history

 Fuad Mahmutović 
 Rasim Demirović ( – 24 April 2019)
 Aleksandar Radosavljević (20 May 2019 – 11 November 2021)
 Edin Hadžiabdić (12 November 2021 – present)

References

External links
 

Bosnia and Herzegovina handball clubs
Handball clubs established in 1956
1956 establishments in Bosnia and Herzegovina
Gornji Vakuf-Uskoplje